The Russia national baseball team is the national baseball team of Russia. The team competed in the bi-annual European Baseball Championship.

After the 2022 Russian invasion of Ukraine, the World Baseball Softball Confederation banned Russian athletes and officials. In addition, WBSC Europe relocated competitions that had been scheduled to be held in Russia during 2022, and excluded Russian teams from all its competitions for both national and club teams to be held in Europe in 2022.

History 
The Russian national baseball team has never won a championship.  Their head coach is Vladimir Timakov. The team was formed in 1987.

Placings
Baseball World Cup
  : 16th
  : 13th
  : 14th

Intercontinental Cup
  : 9th

European Baseball Championship
  : 6th
  : 8th
 1995 : 8th
 1997 : 4th
 1999 : 4th
 2001 :  2nd
 2003 : 8th
 2005 : 11th
 2007 : 10th
 2012 : 12th
 2014 : 8th
 2016 : 12th
 2019 : Didn't qualify

References

National baseball teams in Europe
Baseball
Baseball in Russia
Baseball teams established in 1987
1987 establishments in Russia